Rabbi Ephraim ben Israel Alnaqua (1359–1442) (also, "Al-Nakawa", "Al-Nakava", "Ankava", "Ankoa", "Enkaoua", "Alnucawi", etc., Hebrew: "נקוה", "אלנאקוה", "אנקווה", "אנקאווא") was a physician, rabbi, theological writer, and founder of the Jewish community at Tlemçen (Algeria), where he died in 1442.

According to a legend, Alnaqua escaped from the Spanish Inquisition, which had martyred his father (Rabbi Israel Ben Joseph) and mother at the stake, and came to Tlemcen mounted on a lion, using a serpent as a halter. Azulai refers to him as a miracle worker. Alnaqua succeeded, after all, other physicians had failed, in curing the only daughter of a king of the Zayyanid dynasty. Refusing the reward of gold and silver offered him by the king, he begged only that the Jews living near Tlemçen might be united in it. In this way, the community was formed. Above the rabbi's chair, on which the verse Jer. xvii.12 is engraved, a lamp burns perpetually.

Alnaqua had two sons, Israel and Judah. The latter lived at Oran, Mostaganem, and, later, at Tlemçen, and became the father-in-law of Simeon ben Zemah Duran. Alnaqua wrote for his elder son Israel Shaar Kevod Adonai (Entrance to the Glory of God), containing answers to the criticisms of Nahmanides on the Moreh of Maimonides. Manuscripts of this work exist in the Bodleian Library, Oxford. He also wrote some hymns.

Other family members
 Israel Alnaqua
 Jacky N'Kaoua, aka Papi Jacky

Jewish Encyclopedia bibliography
Azulai, Shem ha-Gedolim, s.v.;
Benjacob, Oẓar ha-Sefarim, p. 599;
Neubauer, Cat. Bodl. Hebr. MSS. Nos. 939, 2; 1258, 2;
Revue Africaine, 1870, pp. 377–383;
Zunz, Z. G. p. 435;
idem, Literaturgesch. p. 524.

References

External links

1442 deaths
15th-century Algerian rabbis
Date of birth unknown
Sephardi rabbis
1359 births